Ademar da Silva Braga Júnior (born 12 August 1976) is a former Brazilian footballer.

Biography
Braga started his career at hometown club Flamengo, one of the most successful Brazilian team. He played his only match (exclude State competition) at 1997 Copa do Brasil. He then played for Americano. In 2002, he was signed by Centro de Futebol Zico Sociedade Esportiva, the club found by Brazilian legend Zico, re-joined former teammate Felipe Veras. Both player left the club in late 2002, which Braga joined Hungarian top division team Békéscsabai Előre. He then returned to Brazil. In June 2005, he left for Petróleos Luanda of Portuguese speaking country Angola, from less famous team Internacional of Limeira, São Paulo state.

In March 2006, he returned to Rio de Janeiro for Estácio de Sá. He then signed a contract in August with Cachoeiras of Cachoeiras de Macacu, Rio de Janeiro state.

After he played for Castelo Branco of Rio de Janeiro city at 2008 season, he retired.

References

External links
 CBF Contract Archive 
 Profile at Futpedia 
 Profile at Flamengo's Futpedia 
 Career at Flamengo at flaestatistica.com 

Brazilian expatriate footballers
J1 League players
Cerezo Osaka players
CR Flamengo footballers
Békéscsaba 1912 Előre footballers
Expatriate footballers in Hungary
Expatriate footballers in Angola
Association football defenders
Footballers from Rio de Janeiro (city)
Brazilian footballers
1976 births
Living people
Brazilian expatriate sportspeople in Angola
Expatriate footballers in Japan